In Greek mythology, Themisto (Ancient Greek: Θεμιστώ) was a Thessalin princess as the daughter of King Hypseus of Lapiths and the naiad Chlidanope. Her name is derived from the Ancient Greek word: "θεμιστος" which means "belonging to the law", or "belonging to the customs".

Family 
Themisto's sisters were Cyrene, Alcaea and Astyagyia. She was the third and last wife of Athamas, a Boeotian king. According to some sources, the couple had four children: Leucon, Erythrius, Schoeneus, and Ptous. In other sources, there were but two: Sphincius and Orchomenus, or else Schoeneus and Leucon. Some say that the father of Leucon was Poseidon (see also Leuconoe).

Mythology 
Themisto intended to kill her husband's children by his previous wife, but accidentally slew her own sons. This was the subject of a non-surviving tragedy by Euripides, retold by Hyginus as follows. Athamas married Themisto as he believed his second wife, Ino, was dead, but Ino turned out to be alive and to have been on Mount Parnassus with the Maenads. Athamas had her brought home but kept her return a secret; Themisto did find out she was back, and resolved to kill Ino's children as an act of revenge. However, she had never seen Ino in person and took her for a servant as they met, and ordered the "servant" to dress all her own children in white clothing, and Ino's in black. Themisto then proceeded to kill all the black-clothed children. What Themisto did not realise was that Ino had switched the children's clothing, and so she in fact killed her own children. Upon discovering that, she killed herself. According to Pseudo-Apollodorus, however, Themisto married Athamas after the death of Ino, and the whole story with the murder of the children did not take place.

Notes

References 

 Apollodorus, The Library with an English Translation by Sir James George Frazer, F.B.A., F.R.S. in 2 Volumes, Cambridge, MA, Harvard University Press; London, William Heinemann Ltd. 1921. . Online version at the Perseus Digital Library. Greek text available from the same website.
Callimachus, Callimachus and Lycophron with an English translation by A. W. Mair ; Aratus, with an English translation by G. R. Mair, London: W. Heinemann, New York: G. P. Putnam 1921. Internet Archive
Callimachus, Works. A.W. Mair. London: William Heinemann; New York: G.P. Putnam's Sons. 1921. Greek text available at the Perseus Digital Library.
Diodorus Siculus, The Library of History translated by Charles Henry Oldfather. Twelve volumes. Loeb Classical Library. Cambridge, Massachusetts: Harvard University Press; London: William Heinemann, Ltd. 1989. Vol. 3. Books 4.59–8. Online version at Bill Thayer's Web Site
Diodorus Siculus, Bibliotheca Historica. Vol 1-2. Immanel Bekker. Ludwig Dindorf. Friedrich Vogel. in aedibus B. G. Teubneri. Leipzig. 1888-1890. Greek text available at the Perseus Digital Library.
Gaius Julius Hyginus, Fabulae from The Myths of Hyginus translated and edited by Mary Grant. University of Kansas Publications in Humanistic Studies. Online version at the Topos Text Project.
 Graves, Robert, The Greek Myths: The Complete and Definitive Edition. Penguin Books Limited. 2017. 
Nonnus of Panopolis, Dionysiaca translated by William Henry Denham Rouse (1863-1950), from the Loeb Classical Library, Cambridge, MA, Harvard University Press, 1940.  Online version at the Topos Text Project.
 Nonnus of Panopolis, Dionysiaca. 3 Vols. W.H.D. Rouse. Cambridge, MA., Harvard University Press; London, William Heinemann, Ltd. 1940-1942. Greek text available at the Perseus Digital Library.

Boeotian mythology
Family of Athamas
Filicides
Lapiths in Greek mythology
Princesses in Greek mythology
Suicides in Greek mythology
Women of Apollo